Magada may refer to 
 Madaba, an alternative spelling of a city in central Jordan 
 Magadha, an alternative spelling of an ancient kingdom of India